Alain Chamfort (born Alain Joseph Yves Le Govic; 2 March 1949) is a French singer of Breton origin.

Life and career 
Chamfort was a promising pianist in his youth, and the piano became his instrument of choice. His first band The Dreamers had minor success as a repertory jazz outfit, and was followed by a typically sixties rock music group Murator.

Chamfort met famed writer and producer Jacques Dutronc, who proposed to help him with future works for television and film, and it is with Dutronc that Chamfort's career expanded. After being discovered by Dutronc, it was with Claude François and ultimately Serge Gainsbourg that he made a number of albums, including his first album recorded as Alain Chamfort: . A single from the album, "" remains one of the most famous songs to date by Chamfort, whose subject is the yacht Manureva which disappeared with her skipper Alain Colas in 1978.

Chamfort composed for the cinema; he worked with Jean-Pierre Mocky and with Arnaud Sélignac. As an actor, he appeared in the short Men/Toys/Girl in 2001. In 2004, he became a member of the board of directors of SACEM.

Discography

Studio albums 
 Je Pense A Elle, Elle Pense A Moi (1973, Flèche)
 Un coin de vie, Madonna Madonna (1974, Flèche)
  (1976, CBS)
 Rock'n Rose (1977, CBS)
 Poses (1979, CBS)
 Amour, Année Zéro (1981, CBS)
 Secrets Glacés (1983, CBS)
 Tendres Fièvres (1986, CBS)
 Trouble (1990, CBS)
 Neuf (1993, Epic)
 Personne N'Est Parfait (1997, Epic)
 Le Plaisir (2003, Delabel)
 Une vie Saint Laurent (2010, Tessland)
 Elles & Lui (2012, Mercury)
 Alain Chamfort (2015, PIAS)
Le désordre des choses (2018, PIAS)

Live albums 
 Double Vie (1988, CBS)
 Impromptu Dans Les Jardins Du Luxembourg (2005, XIII Bis)

Compilations 
 Ce N'est Que Moi (2000, Epic) 1977–2000
 Le Chemin Est Le Bonheur 1976–2006 (2006, XIII Bis) 1976–2005
 Le meilleur d'Alain Chamfort (versions revisitées) (2016, Pias)

Filmography

References

External links 

 
 Biography
 Official website, at sonymusic.fr (in French)
 Fan website (in French)

1949 births
French male singers
French people of Breton descent
Musicians from Paris
Living people